Martuba Airbase is a Libyan Air Force (Berber: Adwas Alibyan Ujnna) base in the Derna District of Libya, located approximately  south-southeast of Derna, and  east-northeast of Benghazi.

History
During World War II the airfield, then known as Martuba Airfield, was used as a military airfield by the United States Army Air Force 57th Fighter Group, during the North African Campaign against Axis forces. The 57th flew P-40 Warhawks from the airfield 16 November-3 December 1942.
 
Following the British victory at El Alamein during the Second World War, the airfield at Maturba saw heavy fighting in 1942, as Rommel's Afrika Korps was pushed back from the Egyptian border.

Military use
The airbase's primary use is by the Libyan Air Force, which has two sections at the base. The first section contains the main buildings and the hangars that house Mil Mi-2 and Mil Mi-8 helicopters. The second section is the flight-line containing taxiways, a ramp, and a single runway. The runway has an additional  paved overrun on each end.

An Aeritalia G.222 is stored on the ramp, but this section of the base appears to be a reserve facility.

Civilian use
The site is also used for the transportation of oil field workers from production facilities in the area.

See also
Transport in Libya
List of airports in Libya

References

External links
OpenStreetMap - Martubah
OurAirports - Martubah Airport

Airfields of the United States Army Air Forces in Libya
Airports in Libya
World War II airfields in Libya
Libyan Air Force bases